INS Hansa,  is an Indian naval air station located near Dabolim in Goa, India.  It is India's biggest naval airbase. The military air base has a civil enclave, that operates as Dabolim Airport.

History
INS Hansa was commissioned on 5 September 1961 at Sulur near Coimbatore, Tamil Nadu. It was initially co-located with the Sulur Air Force Station of the Indian Air Force. It was then home to INAS 551 squadron, operating de Havilland Vampire aircraft, as well as training establishments for Hawker Sea Hawk and Breguet Alizé aircraft.
After the annexation of Goa in December 1961, INS Hansa was transferred to Dabolim.
In 1983, the Indian Navy began inducting the BAE Sea Harrier into service, basing training activities at Dabolim until the Harriers were retired in 2016.
Now the base houses MiG-29KUBs, the tandem two-seat operational trainer variant of the carrier based MIG-29Ks. The aircraft has been inducted into the Navy with a complement of 12 MiG 29Ks that have been purchased with the aircraft carrier INS Vikramaditya (re-fitted and refurbished Admiral Gorshkov of the Russian Navy).

Besides the operation of the MiGs, the Navy also operates Kamov Ka-28 anti submarine helicopters, along with Ilyushin Il-38 May and TU-142M Bear aircraft. Dabolim airbase also hosts exercises by the Indian Air Force's fighter bombers and it has facilities for the Indian Coast Guard which operates a fleet of small aircraft such as Dornier 228s. The Indian Navy also carries out long range maritime patrols as far as the Horn of Africa from Dabolim.

The Navy has an aerobatic team, based at Dabolim, called the Sagar Pawan. The team comprises three Kiran aircraft which carry out aerobatic displays at various locations in the country. The team is used in one or two annual public events in Goa for flypasts of 15 to 20 minutes duration. The Navy also operates a naval aviation museum near Dabolim Airport.

The Indian Navy's Shore Based Test Facility (SBTF), which is a mock-up of the  INS Vikramaditya deck built on the airfield at Hansa is used to train and certify navy pilots of the Mikoyan MiG-29K for operating from the aircraft carrier, and for the developmental trials of the naval HAL Tejas. This SBTF was designed by Nevskoye Design Bureau (NDB) of Russia for Aeronautical Development Agency (ADA).

Units
Over 2,000 Military personnel and 1,000 civilians are based at INS Hansa. It is home to 8 Indian Naval Air Squadrons (INAS).

Among the units based here are:
 INAS 300, "White Tigers", operating Mikoyan MiG-29K fighters
 INAS 303, "Black Panthers" operating Mikoyan MiG-29K fighters
 INAS 315, "Winged Stallions", operating the Il-38 anti-submarine warfare aircraft
 INAS 321, "Angels", operating HAL Chetak helicopters for search and rescue
 INAS 322, "Hornets", operating HAL Dhruv helicopters for search and rescue 
 INAS 339, "Falcons", operating Kamov Ka-31 AEW helicopters
 INAS 310, "Cobras", operating Dornier 228 maritime surveillance aircraft 
 INAS 552, "Xplorers", the only flight testing unit of the Indian Navy

See also
 Indian navy 
 List of Indian Navy bases
 List of active Indian Navy ships

 Integrated commands and units
 Armed Forces Special Operations Division
 Defence Cyber Agency
 Integrated Defence Staff
 Integrated Space Cell
 Indian Nuclear Command Authority
 Indian Armed Forces
 Special Forces of India

 Other lists
 Strategic Forces Command
 List of Indian Air Force stations
 List of Indian Navy bases
 India's overseas military bases

References

Hansa
Buildings and structures in South Goa district